Alina Miszkiewicz (born January 10, 1940) is an American politician who served in the New Jersey General Assembly from the 32nd Legislative District from 1976 to 1978.

References

1940 births
Living people
Democratic Party members of the New Jersey General Assembly